Yelena Rojkova (born May 27, 1989) is a Turkmen swimmer, who specialized in backstroke events. Rojkova qualified for the women's 100 m backstroke at the 2004 Summer Olympics in Athens, by receiving a Universality place from FINA, in an entry time of 1:18.00. She participated in heat one against two other swimmers Lenient Obia of Nigeria, and Ana Galindo of Honduras. She rounded out a small field of three to last place by a 5.53-second margin behind winner Obia, breaking a Turkmen record of 1:15.48. Rojkova failed to advance into the semifinals, as she placed forty-second overall in the preliminaries.

References

1989 births
Living people
Turkmenistan female swimmers
Olympic swimmers of Turkmenistan
Swimmers at the 2004 Summer Olympics
Female backstroke swimmers